The twenty-fifth season of the American animated sitcom series South Park premiered on Comedy Central on February 2, 2022 and ended on March 16, 2022. Consisting of six episodes, it is the shortest season of the show by runtime, and the second shortest by episode count.

Marketing
To celebrate the show's 25th anniversary, live Broadway orchestral covers of the series' songs were performed, alongside the release date of the upcoming season.

On March 16, 2022, a live concert celebrating 25 years of South Park music was announced, which took place at the Red Rocks Amphitheatre in Morrison, Colorado on August 10, 2022. On June 7, 2022, a second concert was announced and took place on August 9, 2022. The concerts featured appearances by Trey Parker and Matt Stone and music by Primus and Ween. The concert aired as a special on August 13 on Comedy Central, which was the anniversary date of the show's premiere, and again on August 14 on Paramount+. In addition, an exhibition, titled South Park: The 25th Anniversary Experience, and various pop-up stores were set up at select locations in the United States and other countries.

Episodes

Reception
Screen Rant felt that the season was too short, saying that "it took quite a while for South Park season 25 to get going. Some of the earlier episodes, such as 'Pajama Day', felt like they were going through the motions with their COVID-related satire, and by the time the season did get going with a pair of Butters-centric episodes touching upon cancel culture and the Russian invasion of Ukraine, the season was already over. Without more episodes to properly develop and marinate character-specific plot threads and the brilliant current events satire that came with them, South Park's latest season, unfortunately, didn't tell a complete and satisfying story."

Home media 
The six episodes of the season are scheduled to be released on Blu-ray and DVD on April 4, 2023.

Notes

References

 
2022 American television seasons